Public holidays in Canada, known as statutory holidays, stat holidays, or simply stats, consist of a variety of cultural, nationalistic, and religious holidays that are legislated in Canada at the federal or provincial and territorial levels. While many of these holidays are honoured and acknowledged nationwide, provincial and territorial legislation varies in regard to which are officially recognized.

There are five nationwide statutory holidays and six additional holidays for federal employees. Each of the 13 provinces and territories observes a number of holidays in addition to the nationwide days, but each varies in regard to which are legislated as either statutory, optional, or not at all.

Many public and private employers, as well as school systems, provide additional days off around the end of December, often including at least a full or half-day on December 24 (Christmas Eve) or December 31 (New Year's Eve) or in some cases, the entire week between Christmas and New Year. While not officially legislated in any capacity, internationally notable cultural holidays such as Valentine's Day, St. Patrick's Day, Halloween, Mother's Day, and Father's Day are traditionally observed by Canadians as part of Canadian culture.

Statutory holidays 
A statutory holiday (also known as "stats" or "general" or "public" holiday) in Canada is legislated either through the federal government or a provincial or territorial government. Most workers, public and private, are entitled to take the day off with regular pay. However, some employers may require employees to work on such a holiday, but the employee must either receive a day off in lieu of the holiday or must be paid at a premium rate – usually  (known as "time and a half") or twice (known as "double time") the regular pay for their time worked that day, in addition to the holiday pay. In most provinces, when a statutory holiday falls on a normal day off (generally a weekend), the following workday is considered a statutory holiday. Statistics Canada shows an average of 11 paid statutory holidays per year in regard to all firms and corporations operating within the province.

Nationwide statutory holidays in Canada

Federal statutory holidays, also observed in some provinces 
In addition to the nationwide holidays listed above, the following holidays are mandated by federal legislation for federally regulated employees. All banks and post offices commemorate these holidays, and they are statutory in some provinces and territories.

Death of Queen Elizabeth II 
On September 19, 2022, the Canadian federal government declared a national day of mourning to commemorate the death of Canada's head of state Elizabeth II, Queen of Canada, on the day of her state funeral. The day was a holiday for federal government employees.

The provinces of British Columbia, New Brunswick, Newfoundland & Labrador, Nova Scotia, and Prince Edward Island also enacted provincial equivalents for the federal holiday. The provinces of Alberta, Ontario, Manitoba, Saskatchewan, and Quebec did not enact any holiday.

Other common holidays

Provincial and territorial holidays 
Provinces and territories generally adopt the same holidays as the federal government with some variations. Only the provincial statutory holidays are shaded:

Alberta 
Five nationwide statutory holidays, four provincial holidays as well as three "optional holidays".

Provincial statutory

 Alberta Family Day – third Monday in February
 Victoria Day – last Monday before May 25
 Thanksgiving – second Monday in October
 Remembrance Day – November 11

Optional

 Easter Monday – optional holiday, variable date between March 23 and April 26
 Heritage Day – optional holiday, first Monday of August
 National Day for Truth and Reconciliation – optional holiday, September 30
 Boxing Day – optional holiday, December 26

British Columbia 
Five nationwide and five provincial statutory holidays.

Provincial statutory

 Family Day – third Monday of February
 Victoria Day – last Monday before May 25
 British Columbia Day – first Monday of August
 Thanksgiving – second Monday of October
 Remembrance Day – November 11

Manitoba 
Five nationwide and three provincial statutory holidays, as well as two optional holidays. Remembrance Day and Boxing Day are not statutory holidays.

Provincial statutory

 Louis Riel Day – third Monday in February
 Victoria Day – last Monday before May 25
 Thanksgiving – second Monday in October

Optional

 Terry Fox Day (Civic Holiday) – first Monday in August; not a statutory holiday.
 Remembrance Day – an "official day of observance", not a statutory holiday.

New Brunswick 
Five nationwide and five provincial statutory holidays. Although prescribed as public holidays, Victoria Day, Thanksgiving, and Boxing Day are not paid public holidays.

Provincial statutory

 Family Day – third Monday in February (since 2018)
 New Brunswick Day – first Monday in August
 Remembrance Day – November 11

Optional

 Victoria Day
 Thanksgiving
 Boxing Day

Newfoundland and Labrador 
 Five nationwide and one provincial statutory holiday. Thanksgiving is not a statutory holiday. Canada Day is not a statutory holiday as July 1 is Memorial Day.

Provincial statutory

 Memorial Day (July 1)
 Armistice Day (Remembrance Day) (November 11)

Optional

 Saint Patrick's Day (March 17)
 Saint George's Day (April 23)
 Victoria Day
 Discovery Day or June Holiday (June 24)
 Orangemen's Day (July 12)
 Thanksgiving
 Boxing Day (December 26)

These have not been observed as statutory holidays since 1992. They are, however, observed by the provincial government. Unlike most other provinces, there is no province-wide holiday on the first Monday in August. It may be seen as redundant due to the Royal St. John's Regatta, which is observed as a civic holiday in St. John's on the first Wednesday in August (or, in case of poor weather, the next suitable day thereafter). Harbour Grace and Labrador City have a similar holiday for their regatta in late July. All other municipalities are entitled to designate one day a year as a civic holiday, however many do not take advantage of this.

Northwest Territories 
Five nationwide holidays and five territorial statutory holidays.

Territorial statutory

 Victoria Day – Monday preceding May 25
 National Aboriginal Day – June 21
 Civic Holiday – first Monday in August
 Remembrance Day – November 11
 Thanksgiving – second Monday of October

Nova Scotia 
Five nationwide holidays plus two provincial holidays. Victoria Day, Thanksgiving, and Boxing Day are not statutory holidays but most businesses and retail are closed Boxing Day. Most statutory holidays can be substituted for a mutually agreeable alternative paid day off in lieu or employers can require employees to work at a premium rate of pay. Several types of employment, including workplaces covered by a collective agreement, are exempt from provincial rules governing statutory holidays.

Provincial statutory

 Heritage Day – This holiday is held on the third Monday of February since 2015, and celebrates notable people, events and locations from the province's history. In 2015, Heritage Day celebrated Black Nova Scotian civil rights activist and businesswoman Viola Desmond.
 Remembrance Day – November 11; this holiday has been governed separately from all other public holidays in Nova Scotia since 1981: it is illegal for any person to offer any goods or real property for sale on this date, or to accept or offer employment in exchange for gain or reward. There are special exemptions for workers who are employed in certain categories but an alternative day off with pay must be offered in lieu.

Optional

 Natal Day – first Monday in August; not a statutory holiday but a common day off in Halifax Regional Municipality.

Nunavut 
Five nationwide and four territorial statutory holidays. Boxing Day is not a statutory holiday.

Territorial statutory

 Victoria Day – Monday preceding May 25
 Civic Holiday – first Monday in August
 Thanksgiving – second Monday in October
 Remembrance Day – November 11

Optional

 Nunavut Day – July 9, originated as a paid holiday for Nunavut Tunngavik Incorporated and regional Inuit associations. It became a half-day holiday for government employees in 1999 and a full day in 2001. Most employers give the day off with the notable exceptions being the federal government and the North West Company. Not a statutory holiday.

Ontario 
Five nationwide and four provincial statutory holidays. Martin Luther King Jr. Day was officially recognized in Toronto in 2018 and has also been in Ottawa, though not as a paid holiday. 

Provincial statutory

 Family Day – third Monday in February
 Victoria Day – Monday preceding May 25
 Thanksgiving Day – second Monday of October
 Boxing Day – December 26

Optional

 Civic Holiday – first Monday in August; not a statutory holiday.
 Remembrance Day – November 11; not a statutory holiday.

Prince Edward Island 
Five nationwide and three provincial statutory holidays.

Provincial statutory

 Islander Day – third Monday in February (originally second)
 Truth and Reconciliation Day – September 30
 Remembrance Day – November 11

In addition, Gold Cup Parade Day is celebrated in the capital city of Charlottetown on the third Friday in August, marking the end of the Provincial Exhibition and the Gold Cup and Saucer race at the Charlottetown Driving Park. The day is observed as a holiday by some businesses in the central and eastern areas of the province.

Quebec 
In Quebec, there are five nationwide and three provincial statutory holidays. Remembrance Day and Boxing Day are not statutory holidays, and there is no civic holiday in August. Many details of employment law are different in Quebec. The official statutory holidays are:
 January 1 (New Year’s Day)
 Good Friday or Easter Monday at the employer’s choice
 Monday preceding May 25 (National Patriots' Day)
 June 24 (Saint-Jean-Baptiste Day)
 July 1. If this date falls on a Sunday: July 2 (Canada Day)
 First Monday in September (Labour Day)
 Second Monday in October (Thanksgiving Day)
 December 25 (Christmas Day).

Optional

 Construction Holiday takes place during the last two weeks of July and also the last two weeks of December for Christmas holidays. While it applies officially only to the construction industry, many other Quebecers arrange to take their vacations during these two weeks.

Saskatchewan 
Five nationwide and five provincial statutory holidays.

Provincial statutory

 Family Day – third Monday in February
 Victoria Day – Monday preceding May 25
 Saskatchewan Day – first Monday in August. Celebration of Saskatchewan history and culture similar to Canada Day.
 Thanksgiving Day – second Monday in October
 Remembrance Day – November 11

Yukon 
Five nationwide and four territorial statutory holidays. In addition, Easter Monday, Boxing Day, and Heritage Day are statutory for public service workers. Many employers give their employees days off that may not be statutory holidays in the particular province, particularly Boxing Day.

Territorial statutory

 Victoria Day – Monday preceding May 25
 Discovery Day – third Monday in August
 Thanksgiving Day – second Monday in October
 Remembrance Day – November 11
 National Aboriginal Day – June 21 since 2017

Optional

 Heritage Day – Friday before the last Sunday in February – optional for non-public service workers

Municipal holidays 
Some municipalities also have local statutory holidays. For instance, the morning of the Stampede Parade is often given as a half-day holiday in the city of Calgary. In Ontario, the August Civic Holiday is not defined provincially, but by each municipality.

Civic holidays 
In Canada, there are two definitions of the term "civic holiday":

Legal definition 
By law, a civic holiday is defined as any holiday which is legally recognized and for which employers are obliged to offer holiday pay.

August Civic Holiday 

In parts of Canada, the term "Civic Holiday" is a generic name referring to the annual holiday on the first Monday of August. However, this definition is far from uniform nationwide as Quebec, Newfoundland, and Yukon do not recognize it at all (in the Yukon, a civic holiday is celebrated instead on the third Monday of August as Discovery Day). Five other provinces (Ontario, Alberta, Manitoba, Nova Scotia, and Prince Edward Island) do not oblige employers to offer holiday pay on this day, thus not making it a civic holiday in the legal sense. No universal name is recognized for this holiday – the official name varies between the provinces and even between municipalities within Ontario. In Saskatchewan, British Columbia, New Brunswick, Nunavut and the Northwest Territories, it is a statutory holiday.

The Civic Holiday is meant to replace a city's birthday, also known as Natal Day. Instead of each city and town having a separate birthday celebration and day off, the Civic Holiday is observed. For example, the Halifax Regional Municipality is made up of the former cities of Halifax and Dartmouth and the town of Bedford. Each of these places used to hold civic birthday celebrations on different days. Many people lived in one jurisdiction but worked in another. This meant significant confusion arose as to which day a person would be excused from work.

This holiday is commonly referred to as "August Long Weekend" but this is not a government term.

Proposed holidays 
The other leading candidate for a new holiday is a weekend in February to celebrate the anniversary of the Canadian flag, or more likely a general "Heritage Day". February 15 is already designated as Flag Day, but this is simply a day of commemoration, not a statutory holiday.

In the province of Nova Scotia, which has relatively few days off, a bill has been introduced for a new holiday for the third Monday in February, to start in 2015.

In April 2014, a private member's bill to make Remembrance Day a legal holiday and give it the same status as Canada Day was introduced to the House of Commons. Bill C-597 passed second reading in the House of Commons by a margin of 258 to 2; however, it did not become law.

In 2001, members of the 14th Legislative Assembly of the Northwest Territories passed the National Aboriginal Day Act, making it the first jurisdiction in Canada to recognize this day as a formal statutory holiday.

Holidays occurring on non-work days 
For federally regulated workers, if a holiday occurs on a day that is normally not worked, then "another day off with pay will be provided".

When New Year's Day, Canada Day, Remembrance Day, Christmas Day or Boxing Day falls on a Saturday or Sunday which a federally regulated worker would not normally work, they are entitled to a holiday with pay on the working day immediately before or after the holiday. If one of the other holidays falls on a weekend, then the employer must add a holiday with pay to their employees’ annual vacation or give them a paid day off at another mutually convenient time.

Other observances 

 Raoul Wallenberg Day, January 17
 Groundhog Day, February 2
 Valentine's Day, February 14
 National Flag of Canada Day, February 15
 International Women's Day, March 8
 Commonwealth Day, the second Monday in March. This has been observed as a holiday in some Commonwealth countries.
 Saint Patrick's Day, March 17
 April Fool's Day, April 1
 Tartan Day, April 6
 Earth Day, April 22
 Victory in Europe Day, May 8
 Mother's Day, second Sunday of May
 Father's Day, third Sunday of June
 Loyalist Day, June 19, celebrating Canada's Loyalist heritage, particularly in Ontario and New Brunswick (also the day Upper Canada was created, now Ontario)
 National Indigenous Peoples Day, June 21 as part of the Celebrate Canada series
 Canadian Multiculturalism Day, June 27 as part of the Celebrate Canada series
 National Peacekeepers' Day, August 9 observed on the closest Sunday
 National Grandparents' Day, second Sunday in September
 National Family Week, week before Thanksgiving
 Halloween, October 31
 National Day of Remembrance and Action on Violence Against Women, December 6

See also

 List of festivals in Canada
 List of holidays by country

Notes

References

Further reading

External links 
 Statutory Holidays in British Columbia
 Statutory Holidays in Quebec 
 iCal Calendars found for ‘Canada’ iCalShare
 Overview of Canadian statutory holidays

 
Canada
Holidays